The Rudi Geodetic Point is a point of the Struve Geodetic Arc in Rudi, Moldova. There is also an obelisk.

Overview
Rudi Geodetic Point was set up in 1847 and is a World Heritage Site (2005). The obelisk was opened on June 17, 2006.

Gallery

External links 
 
 50 lei 2009 arcul geodezic Struve 
 DEZBATERI PARLAMENTARE 
 Preşedintia Republicii Moldova SERVICIUL DE PRESĂ  

2006 works 
Monuments and memorials in Moldova 
2006 in Moldova
Buildings and structures completed in 2006
Tourist attractions in Moldova
Columns and entablature
Monumental columns in Moldova
Obelisks
World Heritage Sites in Moldova